Aethiophysa extorris is a moth in the family Crambidae. It was described by Warren in 1892. It is found in North America, where it has been recorded from Colorado, California, Texas, Arizona, Utah and Nevada.

References

Glaphyriinae
Moths described in 1892
Moths of North America